Sortlandsundet or Sortlandssundet is a strait or sound in Sortland Municipality in Nordland county, Norway. It separates the islands of Langøya and Hinnøya and it connects the Hadselfjorden in the south and the Gavlfjorden in the north.

References

Sortland
Vesterålen